Baryi Gibatovich Kalimullin (April 10, 1907 – July 21, 1989) was a Soviet architect, educator, and social activist. He is credited with helping to build Ufa Aviation University and Bashkir State University.

In 1935-51 Head of sector of urban planning in the trust "Bashprogor" (now institute Bashkirgrazhdanproekt).

In 1951-1963 Senior Research Fellow, Institute of History, Language and Literature BF USSR.

Since 1966 Head of the Department of Architecture at the Kazan State University of Architecture and Engineering.

In 1971-87 at the Ufa Oil Institute, where he initiated at the Faculty of Civil Engineering in 1977 and opened a specialty "Architecture".

Creation

Kalimullin was a founder of scientific research in the field of urban development in the country, Bashkir folk architecture, planning villages. He was one of the organizers and the first president of the Union of Architects of the Republic of Bashkortostan, leading the group for about 30 years.

His research interests included urban planning, architecture, history of the region, art. He published a total of ten monographs, including "Landmarks Bashkiria", "City Salavat", "Caravanserai Orenburg", "City Sterlitamak" (planning and development), "Issues of planning and development of Ufa", "Planning and construction Bashkir villages", and "Bashkir folk architecture".

References

1907 births
1989 deaths
People from Bashkortostan
People from Zlatoustovsky Uyezd
Recipients of the Order of the Red Banner of Labour
Russian architects
Russian architectural historians
Russian architecture writers
Russian urban planners
Soviet architects
Soviet urban planners